Vatica maritima is a tree in the family Dipterocarpaceae, native to Borneo and the Philippines. The specific epithet maritima means "of the sea", referring to species' habitat.

Description
The inflorescences bear cream flowers.

Distribution and habitat
Vatica maritima is native to Borneo and the Philippines. Its habitat is on headlands near the sea.

Conservation
Vatica maritima has been assessed as vulnerable on the IUCN Red List. In Borneo, it is threatened by illegal logging for its timber and by conversion of land for plantations. In the Philippines, it is threatened by changing agriculture patterns.

References

maritima
Flora of Borneo
Flora of the Philippines
Plants described in 1942